Apypema yara is a species of beetle in the family Cerambycidae, and the only species in the genus Apypema. It was described by Galileo and Martins in 1992.

References

Hemilophini
Beetles described in 1992